Thomas J. Burke (October 24, 1896 – March 20, 1966) was a justice of the North Dakota Supreme Court from 1938 to March 20, 1966.

References

Justices of the North Dakota Supreme Court
1896 births
1966 deaths
20th-century American judges